Southern Comfort is the forty-fourth studio album by American country music singer Conway Twitty. The album was released in February 1982, by Elektra Records. Twitty had signed with the label after a long tenure with MCA Records and one of its predecessors, Decca Records; the change in allegiance was owed to a change in management in MCA which also shifted its focus to marketing and promoting newer artists.

This album spawned two #1 country hits. One was in an original song called "The Clown" and the other was in a rendition of the Pointer Sisters' 1981 hit "Slow Hand", which he reworked to suit his personality. The latter single, his 29th #1 country hit, was his final multi-week #1 hit on Billboard's country single charts.

Track listing

Personnel

 Acoustic Guitar – Kenny Bell
 Acoustic Guitar, Lead Guitar – Brent Rowan
 Arranged By (strings) – Bergen White
 Art Direction – Norm Ung
 Backing Vocals – Wennis W. Wilson, Don Gant, Doug Clements, Duane West, James E. "Buzz" Cason, Lea Jane Berinati, Vicki Hampton, Yvonne Hodges
 Banjo – Jack Hicks
 Bass – Bob Wray
 Design – Kosh
 Drums, Percussion – James Stroud, Jerry Carrigan
 Engineer – Ron Treat
 Keyboards – Randy McCormick
 Lead Guitar – Reggie Young
 Lead Vocals - Conway Twitty
 Mastered By – Glenn Meadows
 Photography By – Jim Shea
 Producer – Conway Twitty
 Producer, Recorded By – Jimmy Bowen
 Steel Guitar, Dobro – John Hughey
 Strings – Sheldon Kurland Strings

Charts

References

1982 albums
Conway Twitty albums
Elektra Records albums
Albums produced by Jimmy Bowen